The Icon may refer to:

People
 Matt Hardy (born 1974), American professional wrestler
 Shawn Michaels (born 1965), American professional wrestler
 The Sandman (wrestler) (born 1963), American professional wrestler nicknamed the Hardcore Icon
 Aaron "The Idol" Stevens (born 1982), American professional wrestler
 Sting (wrestler) (born 1959), American professional wrestler
 John Zandig (born 1971), American professional wrestler

Other
 The Icon, a work by Palestinian visual artist Amer Shomali